The Gradiva, The woman who walks, is a modern 20th century mythological figure from the novella Gradiva by Wilhelm Jensen. The figure was inspired by a real Roman relief.

Origins
Gradiva was given her name by Wilhelm Jensen's novella of the same name. In the novella, the protagonist is fascinated by a female figure in an ancient relief and names her "Gradiva" after Mars Gradivus, the Roman god of war.

Description 
The actual relief was described by Hauser as a neo-Attic Roman relief probably after a Greek original from the fourth century BCE. It shows in its complete state the three Agraulides sisters, Herse, Pandrosus and Aglaulos, deities of the dew. Hauser reconstructed the Agraulid-relief from fragments scattered over various museum collections.

The Gradiva fragment is held in the collection of the Vatican Museum Chiaramonti, Rome, and its complement is held in the Uffizi in Florence.

Adaptions 
Salvador Dalí used the name "Gradiva" as a nickname for his wife, Gala Dalí.  He used the figure of Gradiva in a number of his paintings, including Gradiva encuentra las ruinas de Antropomorphos (Gradiva finds the ruins of Antropomorphos).  

The figure Gradiva was also used in other Surrealist paintings. Gradiva (Metamorphosis of Gradiva), 1939, by André Masson, explores the sexual iconography of the character.  Gradiva, 'the woman who walks through walls' is the muse of Surrealism.

In 1937, the Surrealist writer André Breton opened an art gallery on the Rive Gauche, 31 rue de Seine, christening it with the title Gradiva. Marcel Duchamp designed it, giving its door the form of a double cast shadow.

The short artfilm Gradiva Sketch 1 (1978, camera: Bruno Nuytten) by the French cinéaste Raymonde Carasco was described as “a poetic construction about the fetishization of desire, one that seems to go against Freud's reading: the gracious movement of the maiden's foot is seen to be the object itself, not a mere referent, of male desire.”

In 1986, the French surrealist writer and ethnographer Michel Leiris, together with Jean Jamin, founded Gradhiva, a journal of anthropology. Since 2005 it has been published by the Musée du quai Branly in Paris.

Notes

External links
 
 Gradiva - Chiaramonti Museum, Rome
 Gradiva - Freud-Museum, London
 Freud Museum Exhibition Archive: '' Gradiva: The Cure Through Love 
 Raymonde Carasco: Gradiva Sketch 1 (1978)
DailyArt Magazine - Gradiva: What did Freud and the Surrealists See in Her?

Neo-Attic sculptures
Sculptures of the Vatican Museums
4th-century BC sculptures